Hot & Slow is the first compilation by the German hard rock band Bonfire. It is a greatest hits collection with a previously unreleased version of the song "Rock 'n' Roll Cowboy" and released in 1997 on BMG International. During this period, the band gained three new members.

Track listing

Band members
Claus Lessmann
Hans Ziller

References
 Billboard's Listing of Hot & Slow Album

1997 greatest hits albums
Bonfire (band) compilation albums